Senator La Follette may refer to:

Alex M. LaFollette (1845–1927), Oregon State Senate
Doug La Follette (born 1940), Wisconsin State Senate
Robert M. La Follette Sr. (1855–1925), U.S. Senator from Wisconsin
Robert M. La Follette Jr. (1895–1953), U.S. Senator from Wisconsin and son of Robert Sr.